Zimovnikovsky District is an administrative and municipal district (raion), one of the forty-three in Rostov Oblast, Russia. It is located in the southeast of the oblast. Its administrative center is the rural locality (a settlement) of Zimovniki. Population: 37,092 (2010 Census);  The population of Zimovniki accounts for 48.7% of the district's total population.

References

Notes

Sources

Districts of Rostov Oblast